Play in Group C of the 1990 FIFA World Cup completed on 20 June 1990. Brazil won the group, and advanced to the second round, along with Costa Rica. Scotland and Sweden failed to advance, with the latter achieving a unique feat in World Cup history by playing three games in a particular World Cup having every game finish with exactly the same scoreline: a 2–1 loss.

Standings

Matches
All times local (CEST/UTC+2)

Brazil vs Sweden

Costa Rica vs Scotland

Brazil vs Costa Rica

Sweden vs Scotland

Brazil vs Scotland

Sweden vs Costa Rica

Group C
Group
Group
Sweden at the 1990 FIFA World Cup
Costa Rica at the 1990 FIFA World Cup